Zachary Bennett is a Canadian actor and musician, who is known for playing Felix King in Road to Avonlea. He also co-starred in the 2006 TV film Jekyll + Hyde and for voicing Coach Clydesdale on Corn & Peg. He also currently voices Zach Varmitech and Gaston Gourmand on the animated show Wild Kratts.

He was born in London, Ontario. He is the second youngest of four children, and his siblings are fellow actors Garreth Bennett, Mairon Bennett, and Sophie Bennett.

Bennett also formed the indie rock band Yonder in 2004, which was renamed Tin Star Orphans in 2008.

Filmography

Film

Television

Video game

References

External links
 
 

Year of birth missing (living people)
Living people
Canadian indie rock musicians
Canadian male television actors
Canadian male film actors
Canadian male child actors
Canadian male voice actors
Male actors from London, Ontario
Musicians from London, Ontario